Melania is a feminine given name.

Melania may also refer to:

Places
 Melania (Amorgos), an ancient town of Amorgos, Greece
 Mount Melania, Ross Archipelago, Antarctica
 Melania Ridge, Ross Archipelago, Antarctica

Biology
 Melania (gastropod), a former name of the Thiara genus of gastropods
 Melania (moth), a former name of the Siccia genus of moths

See also
 Phthersigena melania, a species of praying mantis native to Australia
 Phyllomacromia melania, a species of dragonfly in family Corduliidae
 Red-rimmed melania, a small freshwater snail with an operculum, in the family Thiaridae